A sorbent is a material used to absorb or adsorb liquids or gases. Examples include:
A material similar to molecular sieve material, which acts by adsorption (attracting molecules to its surface). It has a large internal surface area and good thermal conductivity. It is typically supplied in pellets of 1 mm to 2 mm diameter and roughly 5 mm length or as grains of the order 1 mm. Occasionally as beads up to 5 mm diameter. They are typically made from aluminium oxide with a porous structure.
Materials used to absorb other materials due to their high affinity for doing so. Examples include:
In composting, dry (brown, high-carbon) materials absorb many odoriferous chemicals, and these chemicals help to decompose these sorbents.
A sponge absorbs many times its own weight in water.
A polypropylene fiber mat may be used to absorb oil.
A cellulose fiber product may be used to absorb oil.
The granular gel material in a baby diaper will absorb several times its original weight in urine.
Desiccants attract water, drying out (desiccating) the surrounding materials.

Method of action 

When used in a chemical spill acting as a sorbent, oil-absorbent pads must attract oil preferentially to water i.e. – it should be oleophilic and hydrophobic. Sorbent materials must act by adsorption or less commonly by absorption. Both adsorb material, as well as absorbents, incorporate the oil or other liquid to be recovered into the body of the material.

References

Desiccants
Natural materials
Synthetic materials